Marwan Abou Fadel (Arabic: مروان أبو فاضل) is a Lebanese Greek Orthodox politician and a former Member of Parliament for the Greek Orthodox seat of Aley, in Mount Lebanon.

Early life and education 
Abou Fadel was born in Ain Aanoub, Lebanon in 1958. He is the son of the late Mounir Abou Fadel.

He holds a degree in law from the University of Paris, Assas and master's degree in political science, also from France.

Political career 
Abou Fadel entered political life in 1983 when he became the director of his father's office. He is a former MP of Mount Lebanon, co-founder and vice-chairman of the Lebanese Democratic Party.

He was elected in 1992 as a deputy for the Aley district.

Since 2014, he is the secretary general of the Lebanese Orthodox Gathering (اللقاء الأرثوذكسي).

References 

Lebanese lawyers
Eastern Orthodox Christians from Lebanon
1958 births
Living people
People from Aley District
Lebanese Democratic Party politicians